Domariyaganj is a constituency of the Uttar Pradesh Legislative Assembly covering the city of Domariyaganj in the Siddharth Nagar district of Uttar Pradesh in India.

Domariyaganj is one of five assembly constituencies in the Domariyaganj Lok Sabha constituency. Since 2008, this assembly constituency is numbered 306 amongst 403 constituencies.

Members of Legislative Assembly

Election results

2022

2017
Bharatiya Janta Party candidate Raghvendra Pratap Singh won in last Assembly election, the 2017 Uttar Pradesh Legislative Elections, defeating Bahujan Samaj Party candidate Saiyada Khatoon by a margin of 171 votes.

16th Vidhan Sabha: 2012 General Elections

References

External links
 

Assembly constituencies of Uttar Pradesh
Siddharthnagar district